Li Gwang-ju (born 8 February 1953) is a North Korean weightlifter. He competed in the men's lightweight event at the 1980 Summer Olympics.

References

1953 births
Living people
North Korean male weightlifters
Olympic weightlifters of North Korea
Weightlifters at the 1980 Summer Olympics
Place of birth missing (living people)
Asian Games medalists in weightlifting
Weightlifters at the 1978 Asian Games
Asian Games bronze medalists for North Korea
Medalists at the 1978 Asian Games
20th-century North Korean people
21st-century North Korean people